Utkhu (Quechua for cotton, also spelled Ucto, Utco) is a  mountain in the Wansu mountain range in the Andes of Peru, about  high. It is situated in the Apurímac Region, Antabamba Province, in the districts of Antabamba and Juan Espinoza Medrano. Utkhu lies northeast of Quri Pawkara.

References 

Mountains of Peru
Mountains of Apurímac Region